Dode may refer to:

Geography
Dode, Jalandhar, India
Dode, Kent, United Kingdom

People
Dode, Abbess of Saint Pierre de Reims
Dode Criss
Dode Paskert
Guillaume Dode de la Brunerie
 (1875-1945), French botanist

Other uses
 Dode (steamboat), a small inland steamboat that ran on Hood Canal and Puget Sound from 1898 to 1910